"Sun Bird" is an intermezzo composed by Kerry Mills in 1908. Thurland Chattaway wrote lyrics that appear in some later publications. The chorus is a love song from an Indian warrior to Sun Bird, an Indian maiden:

The song has been recorded numerous times in many different styles.

References

Bibliography
Chattaway, Thurland (w.); Mills, Kerry (m.). "Sun Bird" (Sheet music). Sydney: Albert & Son (c. 1908).
Mills, Kerry. "Sun Bird" (Sheet music). New York: F.A. Mills (1908).

Songs about Native Americans
1908 songs
American popular music
Songs with music by Kerry Mills
Songs with lyrics by Thurland Chattaway